The Crawford County Courthouse is in Denison, Iowa, United States, the county seat of Crawford County. It was listed on the National Register of Historic Places in 1981. The courthouse is the second building the county has used for court functions and county administration.

History
J.W. Denison, a Baptist minister, owned  in Harrison and Crawford counties. He offered to build a courthouse, hotel, and store if the site was named the county seat. His offer was accepted and the place was called Denison. The first courthouse was a clay structure completed in 1859. In addition to its use as a courthouse, the building also functioned as a lecture hall, church auditorium, banquet hall, and Sunday school. It was used for dancing once before protests put an end to that and other festive usages. The first Crawford County Fair was held on the courthouse property in October 1860. A frame addition was built that doubled its size in the 1870s. It was considered unsightly, and it became known as "the wart." The building was added onto again in 1881.

A $75,000 bond issue was passed in 1902 to build a new courthouse. Another bond issue was needed to spend an additional $40,000. The present courthouse was completed for about $115,000 in 1905. It was designed by Nebraska architect George A. Berlinghof in the Beaux-Arts style. The exterior is covered with blocks of Ohio marble, some of which weigh seven tons. It originally had a dome that became to heavy for the structure and it was removed around 1945. The old courthouse had been sold in 1903 and moved across the street. It was used for a variety of commercial enterprises in subsequent years.

See also
List of Iowa county courthouses

References

Government buildings completed in 1905
Denison, Iowa
Beaux-Arts architecture in Iowa
County courthouses in Iowa
Courthouses on the National Register of Historic Places in Iowa
National Register of Historic Places in Crawford County, Iowa
Buildings and structures in Crawford County, Iowa
1905 establishments in Iowa